Posht Rud Rural District is a rural district (dehestan) in the Central District of Narmashir County, Kerman Province, Iran. At the 2006 census, its population was 15,051, in 3,601 families. The rural district has 40 villages.

References 

Rural Districts of Kerman Province
Narmashir County